This is a list of endorsements for declared candidates in the Democratic primaries for the 2020 United States presidential election.

Joe Biden

Withdrawn candidates

Michael Bennet

Michael Bloomberg

Cory Booker

Steve Bullock

Pete Buttigieg

Julian Castro

Bill de Blasio

John Delaney

Tulsi Gabbard

Kirsten Gillibrand

Mike Gravel

Kamala Harris

John Hickenlooper

Jay Inslee

Amy Klobuchar

Seth Moulton

Richard Ojeda

Beto O'Rourke

Deval Patrick

Tim Ryan

Bernie Sanders

Tom Steyer

Eric Swalwell

Elizabeth Warren

Marianne Williamson

Andrew Yang

See also
 News media endorsements in the 2020 United States presidential primaries
 List of 2020 Democratic Party automatic delegates

Notes

References

Democratic Party primaries
2020 United States Democratic presidential primaries